ABC Jazz (formerly Dig Jazz) is a digital radio station, available on mobile devices, DAB+ digital radio, digital TV and online. It is operated by the ABC Jazz team at the Australian Broadcasting Corporation (ABC).

History
ABC Jazz is a part of the Australian Broadcasting Corporation and was originally broadcast on ABC Classic FM. Dig Jazz was launched as a digital only station designed to broadcast a variety of different jazz styles including bebop, acid jazz, cool jazz and contemporary styles of Jazz. Presenters include Mal Stanley, Dr Megan Burslem, James Valentine and Monica Trapaga.

References

External links 
 

Australian radio networks
Australian Broadcasting Corporation radio stations
Public radio in Australia